The 1908 Maine gubernatorial election took place on September 14, 1908.

Incumbent Governor William T. Cobb did not seek re-election. Republican candidate Bert M. Fernald defeated Democratic candidate Obadiah Gardner.

Results

Notes

References

Gubernatorial
1908
Maine
September 1908 events